This is a list of species endemic to the San Francisco Bay Area, the nine California counties which border on San Francisco Bay. The area has a number of highly diverse, local bioregions, including San Bruno Mountain.

Flora

A
Acanthomintha duttonii, common names San Mateo thornmint or Dutton's acanthomintha, found at Montara Mountain in San Mateo County
Amsinckia grandiflora, common name large-flowered fiddleneck, found near the Lawrence Livermore National Laboratory in Alameda County
Arctostaphylos bakeri, common name Baker's manzanita, found in Sonoma County
Arctostaphylos densiflora, common name Vine Hill manzanita, found on land owned and protected by the California Native Plant Society, near Sebastopol, in Sonoma County
Arctostaphylos hookeri, common name Franciscan manzanita, found in The Presidio, San Francisco, in San Francisco County
Arctostaphylos imbricata, common name San Bruno Mountain manzanita, found on San Bruno Mountain in San Mateo County
Arctostaphylos montaraensis, common name Montara manzanita, found on San Bruno Mountain and Montara Mountain in San Mateo County
Arctostaphylos pallida, common names pallid manzanita, Oakland Hills manzanita, and Alameda manzanita, found in the eastern San Francisco Bay Area
Arctostaphylos virgata, common names Bolinas manzanita and Marin manzanita, found in Marin County

B
Blennosperma bakeri, common names Baker's stickyseed and Sonoma sunshine, found in Sonoma County

C
Calochortus raichei, common names Cedars fairy-lantern and Cedars mariposa lily, found in Sonoma County
Calochortus tiburonensis, common name Tiburon mariposa lily, found at Ring Mountain in Marin County
Carex albida, common name white sedge, found in Sonoma County
Ceanothus ferrisiae, common name coyote ceanothus, found at Mount Hamilton in Santa Clara County
Ceanothus masonii
Chorizanthe valida
Clarkia imbricata
Cordylanthus nidularius

D
Deinandra bacigalupii
Delphinium bakeri
Delphinium luteum
Dirca occidentalis
Dudleya setchellii

E
Elymus californicus
Erigeron serpentinus
Eriogonum cedrorum
Eriogonum truncatum
Eriophyllum latilobum

H
Hesperolinon congestum, common name Marin dwarf flax

I
Isocoma arguta

L
Lessingia micradenia
Lilium pardalinum subsp. pitkinense
Limnanthes vinculans

O
Oenothera deltoides subsp. howellii

P
Pentachaeta bellidiflora
Phacelia breweri
Phacelia phacelioides
Plagiobothrys strictus
Poa napensis
Polygonum marinense

S
Sidalcea hickmanii ssp. viridis
Streptanthus batrachopus
Streptanthus callistus
Streptanthus hispidus
Streptanthus niger

Fauna
Apodemia mormo langei
Bay checkerspot
California lizardfish
Calosima munroei
Mission blue butterfly
Porcellio formosus
California clapper rail, also found nominally in other locales, this bird has gotten extensive attention in the Bay Area
Salt marsh harvest mouse
San Bruno elfin butterfly
San Francisco garter snake, San Mateo and northern Santa Cruz County
Sorex ornatus sinuosus
Syncaris pacifica
Thicktail chub

Endangered or extinct
Xerces blue, was found in San Francisco

References

San Francisco Bay area
'
'
endemic species